Apsari Begam is a Nepali cricketer who plays for the Nepal women's national cricket team.

International career 
Apsari Begam had debuted in the international matches for Nepal in the T20I match against United Arab Emirates women's national cricket team on 22 February 2019.  The match was the part of the 2019 ICC Women's Qualifier Asia in Bangkok, Thailand. It was a tournament which is an Asia region qualifier for the 2019 ICC Women's World Twenty20 Qualifier as well as the 2020 Women's Cricket World Cup Qualifier tournaments, with the top team progressing to both of them.

In October 2021, she was named in Nepal's side for the 2021 ICC Women's T20 World Cup Asia Qualifier tournament in the United Arab Emirates.

References

1999 births
Living people
Nepal women Twenty20 International cricketers
South Asian Games bronze medalists for Nepal
South Asian Games medalists in cricket